Khuhra is an historical city in Khairpur District Sindh province of Pakistan. It is approximately 6 hours drive from Karachi, the largest city in Pakistan by population.

References

Populated places in Khairpur District